Johannes Andersen may refer to:
 Johannes Andersen (athlete) (1888–1967), Norwegian athlete
 Johannes Andersen (musician) (1890–1980), Danish musician
 Johannes Carl Andersen (1873–1962), New Zealand clerk, poet, librarian, ethnologist and historian
 Johannes S. Andersen (1898–1970), Norwegian resistance fighter during World War II

See also
Johannes S. Anderson (1887–1950), Finland born U.S. Army soldier and Medal of Honor recipient